Tomanović is a Serbian surname that may refer to:

Goran Tomanović, member of Oktobar 1864
Ljuba Tomanović, member of Crni ples
Zdenko Tomanović, lawyer of Slobodan Milošević
Lazar Tomanović, Prime Minister of Montenegro
Saša Tomanović, Serbian footballer

Serbian surnames